Marco Cornaro (1286–1368) was doge of Venice.

Marco Cornaro may also refer to:
Marco Cornaro (1406–1479), patrician of Venice and the father of Catherine Cornaro, queen of Cyprus
Marco Cornaro (cardinal) (1482–1524), Italian Roman Catholic cardinal
Marco Cornaro (1557–1625), Italian Roman Catholic bishop
Marco Antonio Cornaro (1583–1639), Italian Roman Catholic bishop